Dame Georgina Kingi  is a New Zealand educator who has been principal of the St Joseph's Māori Girls' College since 1987.

Kingi grew up in Poroporo, near Whakatane. She is a member of the Ngāti Awa and Ngāti Pūkeko. She attended St Joseph's and the University of Auckland. Kingi began teaching at St Joseph's in 1969, initially as a Māori language teacher. She became principal of the school in 1987.

Kingi is a licensed interpreter of the Māori language. She was a founding member and former chairwoman of the Hawke's Bay Māori Language Association.

In 1993, Kingi was awarded the New Zealand Suffrage Centennial Medal. She was made a Companion of the Queen's Service Order for Public Services in the 2004 New Year Honours. In the 2017 New Year Honours, she was made a Dame Companion of the New Zealand Order of Merit, for services to Māori and education.

References 

Living people
Ngāti Pūkenga people
Ngāti Awa people
New Zealand Māori women
New Zealand Māori schoolteachers
New Zealand educators
Companions of the Queen's Service Order
Dames Companion of the New Zealand Order of Merit
University of Auckland alumni
New Zealand Roman Catholics
Recipients of the New Zealand Suffrage Centennial Medal 1993
Year of birth missing (living people)